The Hammond organ is an electric organ, invented by Laurens Hammond and John M. Hanert and first manufactured in 1935. Various models were produced, which originally used tonewheels to generate sound via additive synthesis, where component waveform ratios are mixed by sliding switches called drawbars and imitate the pipe organ's registers. Around 2 million Hammond organs have been manufactured, and it has been described as one of the most successful organs ever. The organ is commonly used with, and associated with, the Leslie Speaker.

Tonewheel organs
Tonewheel organs generate sound by shaped mechanical wheels, that rotate in front of electromagnetic pickups. Each tonewheel assembly creates tones with low harmonic content, close to a sine wave. Inside the coil is a permanent magnet. As the profile of the tonewheel pass by, the strength of the magnetism changes—when the highest part is closest to the tip of the magnet, the magnetism is strongest. As the magnetism varies, that induces an alternating current (AC) in the coil, which becomes one of the frequencies used in harmonic synthesis.

Two models in Church-styled cabinet were made under military specifications, and named G (G for "Government contract", with
chorus), and G-2 (with vibrato), to be installed in chapels and officer's messes of U.S. Army and Navy.

Vacuum tube musical instruments
Vacuum tube musical instruments mean electronic musical instruments generating sound with vacuum tube-based electronic oscillators.  Hammond Organ Company commercialized it in the late-1930s as Novachord (1939–1942) and Solovox (1940–1948).  Especially, new designs introduced on Novachord — subtractive synthesis and frequency divider — were immediately followed by many manufacturers of electronic organs and polyphonic synthesizers during the 1940s-1970s.  However, Hammond Organ Company did not adopt these on main products until the late-1960s, except for S series chord organ (1950–1966) and "Solo Pedal Unit" on RT series and D-100 (1949–1969).

Transistor organs
Hammond started to produce transistor organs when the production of tonewheels became too expensive, switching to full-time Integrated Circuit (IC) models in 1975.

Digital organs
After the Hammond Organ Company ceased trading in 1985, production initially went to Noel Crabbe's Hammond Organ Australia, and then to Suzuki Musical Instrument Corporation, who, under the name Hammond-Suzuki, manufacture digital organs.

References

Bibliography
 
 
 
 
 
 
 
Other sources
 
 
  (recreation of original in 1970); Originally published as: 
  Note: It seems a retyped copy of original "Introductory Section" of Service Manual in circa 1975, or similar.
  Note: It seems a reprint of "Introductory Section" of Service Manual circa 1984, or similar.
 

Hammond
Electronic organs